Rear Admiral French Ensor Chadwick USN (February 29, 1844 – January 27, 1919) was a United States Navy officer who became prominent in the naval reform movement of the post-Civil War era. He was particularly noted for his contributions to naval education, and served as President of the Naval War College from 1900–1903.

A native of Morgantown, West Virginia, he attended the United States Naval Academy from 1861 to 1864. During the Civil War years, the academy was relocated from Annapolis, Maryland, to Newport, Rhode Island, due to concerns about secessionist sympathy in Maryland, a border state. In 1881, Lt Commander Chadwick led the investigation into the fog signals at Little Gull Island Light in Long Island Sound after the Galatea ran around in the fog during the evening of May 12, 1881.

Major sea commands included the gunboat , commissioned in 1889. He served in the Spanish–American War, fighting at the Battle of Santiago de Cuba.

As commander of the South Atlantic Squadron he played a major part in the Perdicaris incident of 1904 in Morocco.

He was also a noted historian who wrote several published books, including a noted work on The Causes of the Civil War.

In a 1917 speech, he complained that American women were not having enough children compared to immigrants, and that "soon the older American stock will be replaced completely." He also charged that boys were being made effeminate due to exposure of female public-school teachers.

Portrayal
Chadwick was portrayed by Roy Jenson in the 1975 film The Wind and the Lion.

Awards
 Civil War Campaign Medal
 Sampson Medal
 West Indies Campaign Medal
 Spanish Campaign Medal

References

Together We Served Chadwick, French Ensor, RADM

External links
 
 Register of French Ensor Chadwick Papers, Naval War College - Includes a biographical sketch

1844 births
1919 deaths
Military personnel from Morgantown, West Virginia
United States Naval Academy alumni
United States Navy rear admirals (upper half)
Presidents of the Naval War College
American military personnel of the Spanish–American War
Directors of the Office of Naval Intelligence
Members of the American Academy of Arts and Letters